Kurt Sakowski (23 December 1930 – 25 February 2020) was an East German race walker.

He finished eighth at the 1964 Olympic Games and finished fourth at the 1969 European Championships, both over the 50 km distance.

Sakowski represented the sports clubs SC Einheit Berlin and TSC Berlin and became East German champion over 20 km in 1957 and over 50 km in 1953.

References

1930 births
2020 deaths
East German male racewalkers
Athletes (track and field) at the 1960 Summer Olympics
Athletes (track and field) at the 1964 Summer Olympics
Olympic athletes of the United Team of Germany